A medical thermometer (also called clinical thermometer) is a device which is used for measuring human or animal body temperature. The tip of the thermometer is inserted into the mouth under the tongue (oral or sub-lingual temperature), under the armpit (axillary temperature), into the rectum via the anus (rectal temperature), into the ear (tympanic temperature), or on the forehead (temporal temperature).

History 
The medical thermometer began as an instrument more appropriately called a water thermoscope, constructed by Galileo Galilei circa 1592–1593. It lacked an accurate scale with which to measure temperature and could be affected by changes in atmospheric pressure.

Italian physician Santorio Santorio is the first known individual to have put a measurable scale on the thermoscope and wrote of it in 1625, though he possibly invented one as early as 1612. His models were bulky, impractical and took a fair amount of time to take an accurate oral reading of the patient's temperature.

Two individuals switched from water to alcohol in the thermometer.
 The earliest is Ferdinando II de' Medici, Grand Duke of Tuscany (1610–1670), who created an enclosed thermometer that used alcohol circa 1654.
 Daniel Gabriel Fahrenheit (1686–1736), a Polish-born Dutch physicist, engineer, and glass blower, made contributions to thermometers as well. He created an alcohol thermometer in 1709 and later innovated the mercury thermometer in 1714. Mercury, he found, responded more quickly to temperature changes than the previously used water.

Fahrenheit also created the temperature scale which is named after him, having recorded the system in 1724. The scale is still only mainly used for everyday applications in the United States, its territories and associated states (all served by the U.S. National Weather Service) as well as the Bahamas, Belize, and the Cayman Islands.

Prominent Dutch mathematician, astronomer and physicist Christiaan Huygens created a clinical thermometer in 1665, to which he added an early form of the Celsius scale by setting the scale to the freezing and boiling points of water. By 1742 Swedish astronomer Anders Celsius created the Celsius temperature scale that was the reverse of the modern scale, in that 0 was the boiling point of water, while 100 was freezing. It was later reversed by Swedish botanist Carolus Linnaeus (1707–1778) in 1744.

Working independently of Celsius, the Lyonnais physicist Jean-Pierre Christin, permanent secretary of the Académie des sciences, belles-lettres et arts de LyonFR, developed a similar scale in which 0 represented the freezing point of water and 100 represented boiling. On 19 May 1743 he published the design of a mercury thermometer, the "Thermometer of Lyon" built by the craftsman Pierre Casati that used this scale.

The medical thermometer was used by Dutch chemist and physician Hermann Boerhaave (1668–1738), as well as his notable students Gerard van Swieten (1700–72) and Anton de Haen (1704–76). It was also utilized around the same time by Scottish physician George Martine (1700–1741). De Haen made particular strides in medicine with the thermometer. By observing the correlation in a patient's change in temperature and the physical symptoms of the illness, he concluded that a record of one's temperature could inform the doctor of a patient's health. However, his proposals were not met with enthusiasm by his peers and the medical thermometer remained a scarcely used instrument in medicine.

Thermometers remained cumbersome to transport and use. By the mid 19th century, the medical thermometer was still a foot long (30.28 cm) and took as long as twenty minutes to take an accurate temperature reading. Between 1866 and 1867, Sir Thomas Clifford Allbutt (1836–1925) designed a medical thermometer that was much more portable, measuring only six inches long and taking only five minutes to record a patient's temperature.

In 1868, German physician, pioneer psychiatrist, and medical professor Carl Reinhold August Wunderlich published his studies that consisted of over one million readings from twenty-five thousand patients' temperatures, taken in the underarm. With his findings, he was able to conclude a healthy human's temperature fell within the range of 36.3 to 37.5 °C (97.34 to 99.5 °F).

Dr. Theodor H. Benzinger (13 April 1905 - 26 October 1999) invented the ear thermometer in 1964. Born in Stuttgart, Germany, he immigrated to the U.S. in 1947 and became a naturalized citizen in 1955. He worked from 1947 to 1970 in the bioenergetics division at the Naval Medical Research Center in Bethesda, Maryland.

Classification by location 
The temperature can be measured in various locations on the body which maintain a fairly stable temperature (mainly oral, axillary, rectal, tympanic, or temporal). The normal temperature varies slightly with the location; an oral reading of 37 °C does not correspond to rectal, temporal, etc. readings of the same value. When a temperature is quoted the location should also be specified. If a temperature is stated without qualification (e.g., typical body temperature) it is usually assumed to be sub-lingual. The differences between core temperature and measurements at different locations, known as clinical bias, is discussed in the article on normal human body temperature. Measurements are subject to both site-dependent clinical bias and variability between a series of measurements (standard deviations of the differences). For example, one study found that the clinical bias of rectal temperatures was greater than for ear temperature measured by a selection of thermometers under test, but variability was less.

Oral 
Oral temperature may only be taken from a patient who is capable of holding the thermometer securely under the tongue, which generally excludes small children or people who are unconscious or overcome by coughing, weakness, or vomiting.  (This is less of a problem with fast-reacting digital thermometers, but is certainly an issue with mercury thermometers, which take several minutes to stabilise their reading.)  If the patient has drunk a hot or cold liquid beforehand time must be allowed for the mouth temperature to return to its normal value.

The typical range of a sub-lingual thermometer for use in humans is from about 35 °C to 42 °C or 90 °F to 110 °F.

Armpit 
The armpit (axilla) temperature is measured by holding the thermometer tightly under the armpit. One needs to hold the thermometer for several minutes to get an accurate measurement. The axillary temperature plus 1 °C is a good guide to the rectal temperature in patients older than 1 month. The accuracy from the axilla is known to be inferior to the rectal temperature.

Rectal  

Rectal thermometer temperature-taking, especially if performed by a person other than the patient, should be facilitated with the use of a water-based personal lubricant.  Although rectal temperature is the most accurate, this method may be considered unpleasant or embarrassing ; in 1966, Time Magazine noted "what for many remains a humiliating procedure ... insertion of a rectal thermometer. Also, if not taken the correct way, rectal temperature-taking can be uncomfortable and in some cases painful for the patient. Rectal temperature-taking is considered the method of choice for infants.

Ear 
The ear thermometer was invented by Dr. Theodor H. Benzinger in 1964. At the time, he was seeking a way to get a reading as close to the brain's temperature as possible, since the hypothalamus at the brain's base regulates the core body temperature. He accomplished this by using the ear canal's ear drum's blood vessels, which are shared with the hypothalamus. Before the ear thermometer's invention, easy temperature readings could only be taken from the mouth, rectum, or underarm. Previously, if doctors wanted to record an accurate brain temperature, electrodes needed to be attached to the patient's hypothalamus.

This tympanic thermometer has a projection (protected by a one-time hygienic sheath) that contains the infrared probe; the projection is gently placed in the ear canal and a button pressed; the temperature is read and displayed within about a second. These thermometers are used both in the home and in medical facilities.

There are factors that make readings of this thermometer to some extent unreliable, for example faulty placement in the external ear canal by the operator, and wax blocking the canal. Such error-producing factors usually cause readings to be below the true value, so that a fever can fail to be detected.

Forehead

Temporal artery 
Temporal artery thermometers, which use the infrared principle report temperature, are becoming increasingly common in clinical practice because of their ease of use and minimal invasiveness. Because of the variability of technique and environmental considerations, measurements by temporal artery thermometers may suffer issues of precision, and to a lesser degree accuracy. Temporal thermometers have been found to have a low sensitivity of around 60–70%, but a very high specificity of 97–100% for detecting fever and hypothermia. Because of this, it is suggested that they should not be used in acute care settings like the ICU, or in patients with a high suspicion of temperature imbalance. Evidence supports higher accuracy and precision amongst pediatric patients.

Plastic strip thermometer 
The thermometer is applied to the patient's brow. It is typically a band coated with different temperature-sensitive markings using plastic strip thermometer or similar technology; at a given temperature the markings (numerals indicating the temperature) in one region are at the right temperature to become visible. This type may give an indication of fever, but is not considered accurate.

Classification by technology

Liquid-filled
The traditional thermometer is a glass tube with a bulb at one end containing a liquid which expands in a uniform manner with temperature. The tube itself is narrow (capillary) and has calibration markings along it. The liquid is often mercury, but alcohol thermometers use a colored alcohol. Medically, a maximum thermometer is often used, which indicates the maximum temperature reached even after it is removed from the body.

To use the thermometer, the bulb is placed in the location where the temperature is to be measured and left long enough to be certain to reach thermal equilibrium—typically five minutes in the mouth and ten minutes under the armpit. Maximum-reading is achieved by means of a constriction in the neck close to the bulb.  As the temperature of the bulb rises, the liquid expands up the tube through the constriction.  When the temperature falls, the column of liquid breaks at the constriction and cannot return to the bulb, thus remaining stationary in the tube. After reading the value, the thermometer must be reset by repeatedly swinging it sharply to shake the liquid back through the constriction.

Mercury 
Mercury-in-glass thermometers have  been considered the most accurate liquid-filled types. However, mercury is a toxic heavy metal, and mercury has only been used in clinical thermometers if protected from breakage of the tube.

The tube must be very narrow to minimise the amount of mercury in it—the temperature of the tube is not controlled, so it must contain very much less mercury than the bulb to minimise the effect of the temperature of the tube—and this makes the reading rather difficult as the narrow mercury column is not very visible. Visibility is less of a problem with a coloured liquid.

It has been decided by many states to prohibit the use and sale of mercury thermometers due to the risk of handling and spilling, and the potential to cause mercury poisoning; the vigorous swinging needed to "reset" a mercury maximum thermometer makes it easy to accidentally break it and release poisonous mercury vapors. Mercury thermometers have largely been replaced by electronic digital thermometers, or, more rarely, thermometers based on liquids other than mercury (such as galinstan, coloured alcohols and heat-sensitive liquid crystals).

Gallium
One company  markets a thermometer of this sort which it bills as "the first analogue thermometer without mercury," as it instead uses the liquid metal gallium. Gallium is considered non-toxic and when disposed of does not face environmental concerns. Like mercury, gallium is a liquid at body temperature (melting point 29.7 °C), but according to the manufacturer an alloy of gallium, indium and tin is actually used, resulting in a lower melting temperature.

Phase-change (dot matrix) thermometers 

Phase-change thermometers use samples of inert chemicals which melt at progressively higher temperatures from 35.5 °C to 40.5 °C in steps of 0.1 °C.  They are mounted as small dots in a matrix on a thin plastic spatula with a protective transparent cover. This is placed under the patient's tongue. After a short time the spatula is removed and it can be seen which dots have melted and which have not: the temperature is taken as the melting temperature of the last dot to melt.
These are cheap disposable devices and avoid the need for sterilizing for re-use.

Liquid crystal 

A liquid crystal thermometer contains heat-sensitive (thermochromic) liquid crystals in a plastic strip that change color to indicate different temperatures.

Electronic

Since compact and inexpensive methods of measuring and displaying temperature became available, electronic thermometers (often called digital, because they display numeric values) have been used. Many display readings with a resolution of only 0.1 °C (.2 °F), but this should not be taken as a guarantee of accuracy: the specified accuracy must be checked in the documentation and maintained by periodic recalibration. A typical inexpensive electronic ear thermometer for home use has a displayed resolution of 0.1 °C, but a stated accuracy within ±0.2 °C (±0.35 °F) when new.  The first electronic clinical thermometer, invented in 1954, used a flexible probe that contained a Carboloy thermistor.

Types of Digital Thermometer

Resistance temperature detectors (RTDs)

RTDs are wire windings or other thin film serpentines that exhibit changes in resistance with changes in temperature. They measure temperature using the positive temperature coefficient of electrical resistance of metals. The hotter they become, the higher the value of their electrical resistance. Platinum is the most commonly used material because it is nearly linear over a wide range of temperatures, is very accurate, and has a fast response time. RTDs can also be made of copper or nickel. Advantages of RTDs include their stable output for long periods of time. They are also easy to calibrate and provide very accurate readings. Disadvantages include a smaller overall temperature range, higher initial cost, and a less rugged design

Thermocouples

Thermocouples are accurate, highly sensitive to small temperature changes, and quickly respond to changes to the environment. They consist of a pair of dissimilar metal wires joined at one end. The metal pair generates a net thermoelectric voltage between their opening and according to the size of the temperature difference between the ends.
•Advantages of thermocouples include their high accuracy and reliable operation over an extremely wide range of temperatures. They are also well-suited for making automated measurements both inexpensive and durable.
•Disadvantages include errors caused by their use over an extended period of time, and that two temperatures are required to make measurements. Thermocouple materials are subject to corrosion, which can affect the thermoelectric voltage

Thermistor

Thermistor elements are the most sensitive temperature sensors available. A thermistor is a semiconductor device with an electrical resistance that is proportional to temperature. There are two types of products.
•Negative temperature coefficient (NTC) devices are used in temperature sensing and are the most common type of thermistor. NTCs have temperatures that vary inversely with their resistance, so that when the temperature increases, the resistance decreases, and vice versa. NTCs are constructed from oxides of materials such as nickel, copper, and iron.
• Positive temperature coefficient (PTC) devices are used in electric current control. They function in an opposite manner than NTC in that the resistance increases as temperature increases. PTCs are constructed from thermally sensitive silicons or polycrystalline ceramic materials.
• There are several advantage and disadvantages to using an NTC thermistor thermometer.
• Advantages include their small size and high degree of stability. NTCs are also long lasting and very accurate.
• Disadvantages include their non-linearity, and unsuitability for use in extreme temperatures

Contact
Some electronic thermometers may work by contact (the electronic sensor is placed in the location where temperature is to be measured, and left long enough to reach equilibrium). These typically reach equilibrium faster than mercury thermometers; the thermometer may beep when equilibrium has been reached, or the time may be specified in the manufacturer's documentation.

Remote
Other electronic thermometers work by remote sensing: an infrared sensor responds to the radiation spectrum emitted from the location. Although these are not in direct contact with the area being measured, they may still contact part of the body (a thermometer which senses the temperature of the eardrum without touching it is inserted into the ear canal). To eliminate the risk of patient cross-infection, disposable probe covers and single-use clinical thermometers of all types are used in clinics and hospitals.

Accuracy
According to a 2001 research, electronic thermometers on the market significantly underestimate higher temperatures and overestimate lower temperatures.  The researchers conclude that "the current generation of electronic, digital clinical thermometers, in general, may not be sufficiently accurate or reliable to replace the traditional glass/mercury thermometers"

Basal thermometer
A basal thermometer is a thermometer used to take the basal (base) body temperature, the temperature upon waking.  Basal body temperature is much less affected than daytime temperature by environmental factors such as exercise and food intake.  This allows small changes in body temperature to be detected

Glass oral thermometers typically have markings every 0.1 °C or 0.2 °F.  Basal temperature is stable enough to require accuracy of at least 0.05 °C or 0.1 °F, so special glass basal thermometers are distinct from glass oral thermometers.  Digital thermometers which have sufficient resolution (0.05 °C or 0.1 °F is sufficient) may be suitable for monitoring basal body temperatures; the specification should be checked to ensure absolute accuracy, and thermometers (like most digital instruments) should be calibrated at specified intervals. If only the variation of basal temperature is required, absolute accuracy is not so important so long as the readings do not have large variability (e.g., if real temperature varies from 37.00 °C to 37.28 °C, a thermometer which inaccurately but consistently reads a change from 37.17 °C to 37.45 °C will indicate the magnitude of the change). Some digital thermometers are marketed as "basal thermometers" and have extra features such as a larger display, expanded memory functions, or beeping to confirm the thermometer is placed properly.

Smart and wearable thermometers 

A smart thermometer is able to transmit its readings so that they can be collected, stored and analysed.  Wearable thermometers can provide continuous measurement but it is difficult to measure core body temperature in this way.

See also 

Thermometer
Liquid crystal thermometer

Footnotes

References
Allbutt, T.C., "Medical Thermometry", British and Foreign Medico-Chirurgical Review, Vol.45, No.90, (April 1870), pp.429-441; Vo.46, No.91, (July 1870), pp.144-156.

Medical testing equipment
Thermometers
Italian inventions